Bavil may refer to:
 Bavil-e Olya
 Bavil-e Sofla
 Bavil Rural District